Harry Lake (1911–1967) was a New Zealand politician.

Harry Lake may also refer to:

Harry Lake (boxer) (1902–1970), English boxer of the 1900s, 1910s and 1920s 
Harry Lake Aspen Provincial Park, a provincial park in British Columbia, Canada

See also

Henry Lake (disambiguation)
Harold Lake (disambiguation)